Martina Navratilova and Helena Suková were the defending champions but they competed with different partners that year, Navratilova with Manon Bollegraf and Suková with Larisa Neiland.

Neiland and Suková lost in the first round to Kimiko Date and Nana Miyagi.

Bollegraf and Navratilova lost in the final 6–3, 3–6, 7–6 against Pam Shriver and Elizabeth Smylie.

Seeds
Champion seeds are indicated in bold text while text in italics indicates the round in which those seeds were eliminated.

 Larisa Neiland /  Helena Suková (first round)
 Lori McNeil /  Rennae Stubbs (semifinals)
 Pam Shriver /  Elizabeth Smylie (champions)
 Manon Bollegraf /  Martina Navratilova (final)

Draw

External links
 1994 Toray Pan Pacific Open Doubles Draw

Pan Pacific Open
Toray Pan Pacific Open – Doubles
1994 Toray Pan Pacific Open